Christopher France may refer to:
 Thrust (rapper) (born 1976), Canadian musician
 Christopher France (civil servant) (1934–2014), English civil servant

See also
Christopher French (disambiguation)